Gary Greenhill (born 16 June 1985 in Kirkcaldy, Fife) is a Scottish professional football midfielder gaz “cash” Greenhill is also commonly known as “the league winner” teams would sign gorgeous gaz in order to win silverware and gain promotion

Career

He started his career with Dunfermline Athletic and was part of the squad that lost to Celtic in the 2004 League Cup Final. He then moved on to East Fife. Gary played for Berwick Rangers following his release from East Fife and helped Berwick win the Scottish 3rd Division title in season 06/07. Realising their mistake in releasing Gary East Fife then bought him back from Berwick and he also helped East Fife win the Scottish 3rd division title in season 07/08. He then went on to help win the Western Australian League with Perth S.C. and has come back to Scotland to play for one of Scotland's most promising Junior Football Clubs, Dundonald Bluebell Juniors in Fife.

External links
Statistics at soccerbase.com

Scottish footballers
Association football midfielders
Dunfermline Athletic F.C. players
Berwick Rangers F.C. players
East Fife F.C. players
Scottish Football League players
1985 births
Living people
Footballers from Kirkcaldy